The pool stage of the 2018 Emerging Nations World Championship was the first stage of the 2018 Emerging Nations World Championship, which began on 1 October and concluded on 7 October. The six highest ranked teams were split between Pool A and B, while Pool C consisted of the five lowest ranked teams. The pool stage was followed by the play-off stage beginning on 9 October.

Pool A

{{rugbyleaguebox
| event     = 2018 Emerging Nations – Pool A
| date      = 1 October 2018
| time      = 13:30 AEST (UTC+10)
| team1     = 
| score     = 36 – 10
| report    = Report
| team2     = 
| try1      = K. Cassel (3), Attard, Benson, Rodrigues, S. Stone
| goal1     = Benson (4/7)
| try2      = Bien, Mackey
| goal2     = Bien (1/1), Wiggins (0/1)
| stadium   = Windsor Sporting Complex, Sydney
| attendance= ≈750
| referee   = Blake Williams (Australia)
}}

{{rugbyleaguebox
| event     = 2018 Emerging Nations – Pool A
| date      = 4 October 2018
| time      = 11:55 AEST (UTC+10)
| team1     = 
| score     = 16 – 26
| report    = Report
| team2     = 
| try1      = Campbell, T. Cassel, Muscat
| goal1     = Benson (2/3)
| try2      = Utatao (2), G. Lolo, Schaumkel, Tamasi
| goal2     = Paea (3/4), Samoa (0/1)
| stadium   = St Marys Stadium, Sydney
| attendance= ≈500
| referee   = Mitchell Robinson (Australia)
}}

{{rugbyleaguebox
| event     = 2018 Emerging Nations – Pool A
| date      = 7 October 2018
| time      = 12:20 AEDT (UTC+11)
| team1     = 
| score     = 12 – 24
| report    = Report
| team2     = 
| try1      = Sheedy, Jensen
| goal1     = Bien (2)
| try2      = Utatao (2), Schaumkel, Payne, G. Lolo
| goal2     = Samoa (2)
| stadium   = Kellyville Ridge Reserve, Sydney
| attendance= ≈350
| referee   = Cameron Turner (Australia)
}}

Pool B

{{rugbyleaguebox
| event     = 2018 Emerging Nations – Pool B
| date      = 1 October 2018
| time      = 17:00 AEST (UTC+10)
| team1     = 
| score     = 20 – 18
| report    = Report
| team2     = 
| try1      = D. Ivan, Kovac, Turay, Varga
| goal1     = J. Farkas (2/4)
| try2      = Mamouzelos, Stratis, A. Vrahnos
| goal2     = Stratis (3/3)
| stadium   = Windsor Sporting Complex, Sydney
| attendance= ≈750
| referee   = Dillan Wells (Australia)
}}

{{rugbyleaguebox
| event     = 2018 Emerging Nations – Pool B
| date      = 4 October 2018
| time      = 17:00 AEST (UTC+10)
| team1     = 
| score     = 18 – 13
| report    = Report
| team2     = 
| try1      = N. Farkas, Gerecs
| goal1     = J. Farkas
| try2      = James Wood, Amani Arutahiki
| goal2     = Andrew Kaltongga (2)
| drop2     = Mara
| stadium   = St Marys Stadium, Sydney
| attendance= ≈120
| referee   = Ethan Murray (Australia)
}}

{{rugbyleaguebox
| event     = 2018 Emerging Nations – Pool B
| date      = 7 October 2018
| time      = 18:45 AEDT (UTC+11)
| team1     = 
| score     = 38 – 0
| report    = Report
| team2     = 
| try1      = A. Vrahnos, G. Tsikrikas, Zampetides, Mamouzelos, L. Zarounas, C. Hughes, Constantinou 
| goal1     = Stratis (5)
| try2      = 
| goal2     = 
| stadium   = Kellyville Ridge Reserve, Sydney
| attendance= ≈125
| referee   = Joey Butler (Australia)
}}

Pool C

{{rugbyleaguebox
| event     = 2018 Emerging Nations – Pool C
| date      = 1 October 2018
| time      = 15:15 AEST (UTC+10)
| team1     = 
| score     = 30 – 22
| report    = Report
| team2     = 
| try1      = Dalcik (2), A. Salman-Cochrane (2), Er, Bökeyhan Sürer
| goal1     = Bökeyhan Sürer (3/4), H. Karabork (0/2)
| try2      = Maebata (2), Kaipua, Tengemoana
| goal2     = Sanga (2/3), Moe'ava (1/1)
| stadium   = Windsor Sporting Complex, Sydney
| attendance= ≈750
| referee   = Cameron Turner (Australia)
}}

{{rugbyleaguebox
| event     = 2018 Emerging Nations – Pool C
| date      = 4 October 2018
| time      = 13:40 AEST (UTC+10)
| team1     = 
| score     = 0 – 60
| report    = Report
| team2     = 
| try1      = 
| goal1     = 
| try2      = Bökeyhan Sürer (3), Turgut (2), Erten, Dagdanasar, A. Karabork, Baskonyali, Celikutan
| goal2     = Bökeyhan Sürer (7/9), Dagdanasar (1/1), J. Salman-Cochrane (0/1)
| stadium   = St Marys Stadium, Sydney
| attendance= ≈500
| referee   = Robert Morey (Australia)
}}

{{rugbyleaguebox
| event     = 2018 Emerging Nations – Pool C
| date      = 4 October 2018
| time      = 15:20 AEST (UTC+10)
| team1     = 
| score     = 6 – 62
| report    = Report
| team2     = 
| try1      = McMurrich
| goal1     = Lindsay (1/1)
| try2      = Korostchuk (3), S. Maslanka (2), M. Maslanka (2), Metuangaro (2), Mykietyn (2), Niszczot
| goal2     = Niszczot (7)
| stadium   = St Marys Stadium, Sydney
| attendance= ≈500
| referee   = Blake Williams (Australia)
}}

{{rugbyleaguebox
| event     = 2018 Emerging Nations – Pool C
| date      = 7 October 2018
| time      = 14:00 AEDT (UTC+11)
| team1     = 
| score     = 32 – 12
| report    = Report
| team2     = 
| try1      = Singamoana (2), Angikimua, Momoa, Sanga, Sa'omatangi, L. Tongaka
| goal1     = Moe'ava (2/5), Sanga (0/2)
| try2      = Griffiths, Waugh
| goal2     = Lindsay (2/2)
| stadium   = Kellyville Ridge Reserve, Sydney
| attendance= ≈250
| referee   = Dillan Wells (Australia)
}}

{{rugbyleaguebox
| event     = 2018 Emerging Nations – Pool C
| date      = 7 October 2018
| time      = 17:10 AEDT (UTC+11)
| team1     = 
| score     = 6 – 58
| report    = Report
| team2     = 
| try1      = F. Karino
| goal1     = F. Karino
| try2      = M. Maslanka (2), Niszczot (2), Artsivourtis, Bryan, Mikalowski, Niedzwiecki, Szczerbanik, Usher
| goal2     = Niszczot (9)
| stadium   = Kellyville Ridge Reserve, Sydney
| attendance= ≈220
| referee   = Joseph Green (Australia)
}}

External links
 2018 Emerging Nations World Championship on RugbyLeagueProject.org

References

2018 in rugby league
Rugby League Emerging Nations Tournament